Caponegro is an Italian surname. Notable people with the surname include:

Selen (actress) (born Luce Caponegro in 1966), Italian actress and TV presenter
Mary Caponegro (born 1956), American experimental fiction writer

See also
Caponigro

Italian-language surnames